In the Shadow of No Towers is a 2004 work of comics by American cartoonist Art Spiegelman.  It is about Spiegelman's reaction to the September 11 attacks on the World Trade Center in 2001.  It was originally serialized as a comic strip in the German newspaper Die Zeit from 2002 until 2004, and was collected as an oversized board book in 2004 with early American comic strips as supplementary material.

Overview
The book evolved from Spiegelman's experiences during the September 11 terrorist attacks. Spiegelman has said that the book was a way to reclaim himself from the post-traumatic stress disorder he suffered after the attacks.

It also has many references to Spiegelman's Maus comics, for example one in which Art said that the smoke in Manhattan smelled just like Vladek said the smoke in the concentration camps smelled.  Also he often turns himself into a mouse on the fly.

It was published by the German newspaper Die Zeit  after Spiegelman was unable to secure publication in any major American outlet. In Britain, excerpts were published in The Independent.  The comic was serialised in full in the London Review of Books from March-September 2003. A segment also appeared in 2004 as part of the Actus Tragicus comics album Dead Herring Comics.

In 2004, the series of ten strips and a supplement of reprints of turn-of-the-20th-century comic strips such as The Katzenjammer Kids and The Yellow Kid were collected and published together as a book by Viking Books. In the Shadow of No Towers was selected by The New York Times as one of the 100 Notable Books of 2004.

In popular culture
In the Shadow of No Towers is the inspiration for a symphony by Mohammed Fairouz.

See also
September 11, 2001 attacks in popular culture

References

 
 

2001 comics debuts
2004 comics endings
Comics set in the 2000s
Comics set in New York City
Pantheon Books comics titles
Books about the September 11 attacks
Comics set during the Iraq War
Comics by Art Spiegelman
Non-fiction comics
Viking Press books
Autobiographical comics
Cultural depictions of George W. Bush
Cultural depictions of Osama bin Laden
Comics about politics
Satirical comics
Anti-war comics